Orešani is a village in the municipality of Zelenikovo, North Macedonia. Orešani's distance is 1.93 km (1.2 mi) away from the center of the municipality.

Demographics
As of the 2021 census, Orešani had 640 residents with the following ethnic composition:
Macedonians 474
Albanians 96
Persons for whom data are taken from administrative sources 42
Serbs 15
Others 8
Bosniaks 5

According to the 2002 census, the village had a total of 515 inhabitants. Ethnic groups in the village include:
Macedonians 387
Albanians 103
Serbs 12 
Romani 4
Turks 1
Others 8

References

Villages in Zelenikovo Municipality
Albanian communities in North Macedonia